Srinivasan Chandrasegaran is a professor in the department of Environmental Health and Engineering at Johns Hopkins Bloomberg School of Public Health. He is known for his work on Genome Editing and for inventing zinc finger nuclease (ZFN) technology, which is capable of cleaving the structure of DNA.

References

Year of birth missing (living people)
Living people
Johns Hopkins University faculty